The city of Xinmin is a county-level city of Liaoning Province, Northeast China, under the administration of the prefecture-level city of Shenyang. It contains the westernmost point of and is by far the most spacious of the county-level divisions of Shenyang City. Xinmin borders Faku County to the northeast, Shenbei New Area and Yuhong District to the east, Tiexi District to the southeast, and Liaozhong County to the south; it also borders the prefecture-level cities of Jinzhou to the west and Fuxin to the northwest.

Administrative divisions
The city administration of Xinmin covers five subdistricts, 11 towns, and 13 townships.

Subdistricts:
Dongcheng Subdistrict, Xicheng Subdistrict, Liaobin Subdistrict, Xinliu Subdistrict, Xincheng Subdistrict

Towns:
Dahongqi, Liangshan, Daliutun, Gongzhutun, Xinglong, Xinglongbao, Hutai, Fahaniu, Qiandangbao, Damintun, Liuhegou

Townships:
Gaotaizi Township, Jinwutaizi Township, Hongqi Township, Lutun Township, Yaobao Township, Zhoutuozi Township, Yujiawobao Township, Xinnongcun Township, Dongsheshanzi Township, Taotun Township, Luojiafangzi Township, Sandaogangzi Township, Zhangjiatun Township

Climate

References

External links

Cities in Liaoning
County-level divisions of Liaoning
Shenyang